Jérôme Bottelin (born May 3, 1978, in Nancy) is a French professional football player. Currently, he plays in the Championnat de France amateur for US Raon-l'Étape.

He played on the professional level in Ligue 1 for AS Nancy and in Ligue 2 for AS Nancy and AS Beauvais Oise.

References 

1978 births
Living people
French footballers
Ligue 1 players
Ligue 2 players
AS Nancy Lorraine players
AS Beauvais Oise players
Valenciennes FC players
Angoulême Charente FC players
US Raon-l'Étape players
Association football forwards